Pedro Buchardo (1916–1971) was an Argentine actor. He was born in Carmen, Santa Fe.

Filmography
Un guapo del 900 (1971)
Los Mochileros (1970)
Gitano (1970)
Amalio Reyes, un hombre (1970)
El Señor Presidente (no estrenada comercialmente - 1969)
Los contrabandistas (mediometraje - 1967)
La Cosecha (1966)
Gente conmigo (1965)
Asalto a la ciudad (1961)
Los de la mesa 10  (1960)
Luna Park (1960)
El bote, el río y la gente (1960)
Procesado 1040 (1958)
Captura recomendada (1950)
Edición extra (1949)
El muerto falta a la cita (1944)

Sources

External links
 

Argentine male film actors
1916 births
1971 deaths
20th-century Argentine male actors
People from General López Department